This is a complete list of songs by the South Korean singer Chungha.

A

B

C

D

E

F

G

H

I

K

L

M

N

O

P

Q

R

S

T

W

X

Y

Other songs

References

C